Pirates of the Caribbean is a Walt Disney Company franchise that originated with the theme park attraction of the same name opened at Disneyland in 1967, the last such attraction that Walt Disney himself oversaw the building of. Although the franchise originated from ride attractions, it gained mainstream popularity in the 2000s with the release of the film series created by Ted Elliott and Terry Rossio, which was followed by the release of several video games attached to both the films and the franchise. The first two games, The Curse of the Black Pearl and Pirates of the Caribbean, released by TDK Mediactive and Bethesda Softworks respectively, are based on the first film in the franchise, The Curse of the Black Pearl (2003). The games are set in the same universe and storyline as the film, but the former is a prequel involving Captain Jack Sparrow and the latter had no relation to the characters featured in the film. The Legend of Jack Sparrow, released in 2006, featured several adventures of Sparrow after the events of the second film, Dead Man's Chest (2006).

The video game, At World's End, followed in 2007. The game, released as a tie-in to the film of the same name, follows the same story explored in both the second and third films, and includes new characters and missions.  That same year, Pirates of the Caribbean Online was released. It was scheduled to be released alongside the second film, but suffered several delays during development. Armada of the Damned was announced in 2009 as an open world action-adventure role-playing game set for a 2011 release. The game was canceled in 2010, and Lego Pirates of the Caribbean launched with the release of the fourth film, On Stranger Tides (2011); the game's storyline covers all four films.

Video games 
, nine video games focused on the Pirates of the Caribbean franchise have been released. The following table showcases the correspondent title, release date, publisher, developer, and the platforms on which each game was released along with any other relevant information. A detailed overview of each game can be found in the corresponding articles, with the exception of games without articles.

Related video games
Video games that include material related to the Pirates of the Caribbean franchise.

See also 
 List of video game franchises

References 

Pirates of the Caribbean